The College of Business Education (CBE) is a higher learning institution in Tanzania established in 1965, registered and accredited
 by the National Council for Technical Education (NACTE) to offer Certificate, Diploma and Degree Programmes in various fields of study.

Academic departments 
The College of Business Education has six academic departments as of 2019:

Accountancy
Business Administration
ICT and Mathematics
Marketing
Metrology and Standardization
Procurement and Supply Management

Programmes offered 
Undergraduate and Postgraduate Programmes offered at CBE as of 2019:

Undergraduate programs 
Technician certificate courses (NTA level 4–5)
 Technician Certificate in Accountancy
 Technician Certificate in Business Administration
 Technician Certificate in Marketing Management
 Technician Certificate in Procurement and Supplies Management
 Technician Certificate in Metrology and Standardization (DSM only)
 Technician Certificate in Information Technology

Ordinary diploma courses (NTA level 6)
 Ordinary Diploma in Accountancy
 Ordinary Diploma in Business Administration
 Ordinary Diploma in Marketing
 Ordinary Diploma in Procurement and Supplies Management
 Ordinary Diploma in Metrology and Standardization (DSM Only)
 Ordinary Diploma in Information Technology

bachelor's degree courses (three years) (NTA level 7–8)
 Bachelor's degree in Accountancy (BACC)
 Bachelor's degree in Business Administration (BBA)
 Bachelor's degree in Marketing (BMK)
 Bachelor's degree in Procurement and Supplies Management (BPS)
 Bachelor's degree in Metrology and Standardization (BMET)
 Bachelor's degree in Business Studies with Education (BBSE)
 Bachelor's degree in Information Technology (BIT)

Postgraduate programmes 
Postgraduate diploma courses
 Postgraduate Diploma in Project Management (PGDPM)
 Postgraduate Diploma in Business Administration (PGDBA)
 Postgraduate Diploma in Financial Management (PGDFM)

Masters courses
 Masters for Information Technology in Project Management (IT-Project Management)
 Masters of Information and Communication Technology for Development (ICT4D)
 Masters of Supply Chain Management (MSCM)
 Masters of International Business Management (MIBM)
 Masters of Business Administration in Finance and Banking
 Masters of Business Administration in Human Resource Management
 Masters of Business Administration in Marketing Management

Rankings 
In 2018, The Webometrics Ranking placed CBE on the 21st rank in the best Universities and Colleges in Tanzania. In 2019, CBE was ranked 15th in the best Universities and Colleges in Tanzania and it was also ranked 2nd in the best Colleges in Tanzania after Nelson Mandela African Institute of Science & Technology (NM-AIST).

References

External links
 

Colleges in Tanzania
Education in Dar es Salaam
Public universities in Tanzania